Andrew George Burry (February 2, 1873 – January 22, 1975) was a businessman, manufacturer and philanthropist. Born in Undervillier, Switzerland, he emigrated to the United States in 1884. Burry founded the Wayne Paper Box and Printing Corp. in 1898, and was also the founder and President of the National Paper Box Manufacturing Association(s) in 1917 - 1918, and 1926 - 1928. 

He donated lavish sums to the YMCA, and in his hometown of Fort Wayne, Indiana, he was a trustee of the YMCA College there and of the Congregational Church.

1873 births
1975 deaths
American manufacturing businesspeople
American centenarians
Men centenarians
People from Fort Wayne, Indiana
Swiss emigrants to the United States